Anabel Medina Garrigues and Virginia Ruano Pascual were the defending champions, but both chose not to participate that year.

Julia Görges and Vladimíra Uhlířová won in the final, 6–4, 6–2, against Camille Pin and Klára Zakopalová.

Seeds

Draw

Draw

External links
 Draw

Banka Koper Slovenia Open - Doubles
Banka Koper Slovenia Open